Chris Marion (born January 8, 1962) is an American musician best known as a member of the Little River Band and for his contribution to the rock and gospel music industries.
Born in Belton, Texas, and growing up in rural Virginia, Marion started his musical career as a pianist for his traveling family gospel group.  He started taking piano lessons at age four and continued classical training on piano, trombone, and voice through college.

Early life
After graduating with honors from Chilhowie High School in 1980, Marion pursued a degree in Music at Carson-Newman College in Jefferson City, Tennessee. He eventually graduated with a degree in psychology. It was during his time at Carson Newman that he developed the relationships that led him to Nashville, Tennessee to pursue music professionally.

Career
Since moving to Nashville in 1987, Marion has toured with the likes of Steven Curtis Chapman, Shenandoah, Beth Moore and Jeannie Seely of the Grand Ole Opry. In 1994, along with Danny Myrick, Marion founded the country rock band Western Flyer on the Step One Record label which garnered four charting Billboard singles in the country genre along with critical praise.

As the writer and producer of a variety of children's musical projects, Marion has received 4 Gospel Music Association Dove Award nominations.  He has been involved in projects involving LifeWay Christian Resources VBS and other religious products for Word Records, Benson Records and others.  As a producer, Marion was part of a team that worked with Garth Brooks, Doug Stone, the Oak Ridge Boys and Charlie Chase.

At the end of 2004, Marion was invited to join Little River Band in which he is the keyboardist and a vocalist.

In 2011, Marion founded TourPRO, a touring personnel resource that facilitates personnel placement with artists and tours.

In 2013, Marion joined the editorial team at Harmony Central, a weekly e-magazine that features articles about the music industry, gear reviews, artist interviews and discussion forums.

In 2020, Marion married Stephanie Calvert, of the band, Starship. During their COVID-19 band hiatuses, they formed a duo, The B-Listers, with limited North American touring coordinating with the touring schedules of their respective bands.

Discography

External links 
 Official Chris Marion homepage

References 

1962 births
Living people
20th-century American keyboardists
American rock musicians
Musicians from Virginia
Musicians from Tennessee
Musicians from Texas
People from Belton, Texas
Musicians from Nashville, Tennessee
Carson–Newman University alumni
Little River Band members
21st-century American keyboardists